Norman Alexander William Billing (15 January 1913 – 1 November 1989) was an Australian politician.

He was born at Port Melbourne to plumber Henry Ernest Billing and Nellie Marquis. He attended state schools at Springvale and Dandenong, and entered the public service in 1928. During World War II he was a sergeant in the Field Ambulance; he was also a cricketer, playing for Prahran and Richmond from 1931 to 1947. From 1953 to 1976 he managed Springvale Community Hospital, and he was also closely involved with St John Ambulance. A member of the Liberal Party, he served on Dandenong Shire Council in 1955, on Springvale and Noble Park Shire Councils from 1955 to 1959 (as president from 1957 to 1958), and on Springvale City Council from 1962 to 1965. In 1967 he was elected to the Victorian Legislative Assembly as the member for Heatherton. He moved seats to Springvale in 1976 but was defeated in 1979. Billing died in 1989.

References

1913 births
1989 deaths
Liberal Party of Australia members of the Parliament of Victoria
Members of the Victorian Legislative Assembly
20th-century Australian politicians